Raby is a small hamlet in the civil parish of Holme East Waver in Cumbria, United Kingdom.

See also

Listed buildings in Holme East Waver

References 

 Raby, Cumbria

Hamlets in Cumbria
Allerdale